Rebeca Rodrigues de Andrade (born 8 May 1999) is a Brazilian artistic gymnast. She is the 2020 Olympic and 2021 World champion on the vault and 2022 World all-around champion. Andrade is the first Brazilian female gymnast to medal at an Olympic Games, and she is only the second Brazilian woman to win a gold medal at the World Artistic Gymnastics Championships. She is also the 2020 Olympic silver medalist and the 2021 Pan American champion in the all-around and won silver on the uneven bars at the 2021 World Championships and a bronze on the floor exercise at the 2022 World Championships. She was a member of the teams that won gold at the 2021 Pan American Championships and silver at the 2018 Pan American Championships. She has also won a total of six gold medals on the FIG World Cup circuit.

Andrade is the 2012 Junior Pan American champion in the all-around and on vault and floor exercise. Additionally, she is the 2014 Junior Pan American champion on the vault, uneven bars, and balance beam. After a successful junior career, Andrade's senior debut in 2015 was cut short by the first of three ACL tears. She returned to competition and represented Brazil at the 2016 Summer Olympics, where she placed eleventh in the all-around final. She tore her ACL for the second time in 2017 but made her World Championships debut in 2018. After her third ACL tear in 2019, Andrade represented Brazil at the 2020 Summer Olympics and at the 2021 World Championships, where she won the vault gold medal at both events.

Early life and background
Rebeca Andrade was born on 8 May 1999 in Guarulhos. She is one of eight children of a single mother, Rosa. Her mother cleaned houses and walked to work in order to pay for Rebeca's gymnastics training. She began gymnastics when she was four years old after her aunt took her to the gym where she worked. When she was nine years old she moved to train in Curitiba, and a year later she moved to Rio de Janeiro to train at Flamengo. She speaks both Portuguese and English, and she is Afro-Brazilian.

Junior career

2012
Andrade made her international debut when she was thirteen years old at the Junior Pan American Championships. She helped Brazil win the team silver medal behind Canada and ahead of Mexico. Individually, she won the gold medal in the all-around, on vault, and the floor exercise, and she won the bronze medal on the balance beam. Then at the Junior South American Championships in Cochabamba, she placed first with the Brazilian team as well as in the individual all-around. She also competed at the Brazil Trophy, a domestic competition for both juniors and seniors, where she edged out Olympians including Jade Barbosa and Daniele Hypólito to claim the all-around title.

2013
Andrade continued her success at the junior level in 2013. She began her 2013 season at the Nadia Comăneci Invitational in Oklahoma City, and she won the gold medal in the junior all-around. In August, she competed at her second Junior South American Championships, and the Brazilian team won the gold medal. Individually, Andrade won the bronze medal in the all-around behind teammates Lorrane Oliveira and Flávia Saraiva. She also won the gold medal on vault and uneven bars and the silver medal on the balance beam behind Saraiva. In November, she competed at the Gymnasiade, which were held in Brasília. The Brazilian team won the silver medal behind Russia, and Andrade won the bronze medal in the all-around behind Alla Sosnitskaya and Flávia Saraiva. In the event finals, she won the gold medal on vault and placed sixth on the floor exercise.

2014
In February, Andrade began the season by competing at the WOGA Classic in Plano, Texas. She won the gold in the all-around, on vault, and uneven bars, and she won the silver with the team on balance beam and floor exercise. She later competed at the Junior Pan American Championships in Aracaju where she helped team Brazil win the silver medal behind Canada. Individually, she won the silver in the all-around and on floor exercise both behind Flávia Saraiva and the gold on vault, uneven bars, and balance beam. She was initially scheduled to represent Brazil at the 2014 Summer Youth Olympics in Nanjing, China. However, she withdrew due to a broken toe and was replaced by teammate Flávia Saraiva. Andrade did not compete for the rest of the 2014 season.

Senior career

2015
Andrade became age-eligible for senior international competitions in 2015. She recovered from her toe injury and made her senior international debut at the Ljubljana World Cup, where she won the bronze medal on the uneven bars behind Isabela Onyshko and Jonna Adlerteg. She then went to the São Paulo World Cup and won the silver medal on vault behind Deng Yalan; she placed seventh on the uneven bars. She then went to the Flanders International Team Challenge in Ghent where a mixed team of Brazilian and Italian gymnasts won the bronze medal. In the all-around, she won the silver medal behind Flavia Saraiva. In June, Andrade tore her ACL which caused her to miss her most important competitions of the season – the Pan American Games and the World Championships.

2016
In 2016, Andrade returned to competition after her ACL injury and won five medals on the World Cup circuit and also competed at her first Olympic Games. She returned at the City of Jesolo Trophy. She only competed on the vault, uneven bars, and balance beam. She helped the Brazilian team win the silver medal behind the United States. She qualified for the uneven bars event final where she finished eighth. She then competed at the Doha World Cup and won the silver medal on the uneven bars behind Jonna Adlerteg.

She was selected to compete at the Olympic Test Event alongside Jade Barbosa, Daniele Hypólito, Lorrane Oliveira, Carolyne Pedro, and Flavia Saraiva to attempt to qualify Brazil a team quota for the Olympic Games. Andrade competed on vault and uneven bars only, and she performed a double-twisting Yurchenko vault and a clean uneven bars routine. The Brazilian team won the gold medal in the team event and qualified a full team to the 2016 Summer Olympics. Individually, she qualified for the uneven bars final, where she won the bronze medal behind Germans Elisabeth Seitz and Sophie Scheder.

She then competed at the São Paulo World Cup, where she qualified for the uneven bars and balance beam finals. In the uneven bars final, she tied with German Kim Bui for the silver medal. The next day on the balance beam, she won the bronze medal behind teammate Daniele Hypólito and Simona Castro. She then went to the Anadia World Cup where she won two silver medals on balance beam and floor exercise, both behind teammate Flavia Saraiva.

After the Anadia World Cup, Andrade was named to represent Brazil at the 2016 Summer Olympics alongside Jade Barbosa, Daniele Hypólito, Lorrane Oliveira, and Flavia Saraiva. Her final competition in preparation for the Olympics was a friendly meet in the Netherlands on 10 July where she tied with Dutch gymnast Eythora Thorsdottir for the gold medal in the all-around.

At the 2016 Olympics, Andrade performed well in the qualification round and helped Brazil qualify for the team finals in fifth place. She qualified individually to the all-around final in third place with a total score of 58.732 behind American gymnasts Simone Biles and Aly Raisman. During the team finals, Andrade fell on the floor exercise, and the Brazilian team finished eighth. In the individual all-around, she finished eleventh with a total score of 56.965.

After the Olympics, Andrade competed at the Brazilian Championships in November. She won the gold medal with the Flamengo club team in the all-around, uneven bars, and balance beam. She won the silver medal on the floor exercise behind Thais Fidelis.

2017
Andrade won three World Cup medals in 2017 but also endured two different injuries. She began her season at the City of Jesolo Trophy, where the Brazilian team won the silver medal behind the United States. Andrade won the silver medal in the all-around behind American gymnast Riley McCusker. In the event finals, she finished fifth on the uneven bars, sixth on the balance beam, and fourth on the floor exercise. She then competed at the Koper Challenge Cup and won the gold medal on vault. Then at the Osijek Challenge Cup, she only competed on the uneven bars but did not qualify for the event final.

In May, Andrade injured her ankle during training and had to wear a protective boot for two months. She returned to competition in August at the Brazilian Championships, where she only competed on the uneven bars and won the gold medal. She then competed at the Varna Challenge Cup and won the gold medal on both the vault and the uneven bars.

Andrade was initially named to the World Championships team along with first-year senior Thais Fidelis; however, she tore her ACL for a second time during the warmups for podium training and withdrew.

2018–19
Andrade competed at her first World Championships in 2018 after returning from her second ACL tear but only was able to compete for a little less than a year before tearing her ACL for the third time. She returned to competition in September 2018 at the Pan American Championships. She only competed on two events, the vault and uneven bars. She helped the Brazilian team win the silver medal behind the United States. She was then named to the Brazilian team for the 2018 World Championships alongside Jade Barbosa, Thais Fidelis, Lorrane Oliveira, and Flavia Saraiva. Andrade made her World Championships debut and competed on the vault, uneven bars, and balance beam, and Brazil qualified for the team final in fifth place. In the team final, the Brazilian team finished seventh after Andrade, Barbosa, and Saraiva all fell on the uneven bars. After the World Championships, Andrade competed at the 2018 Cottbus World Cup where she won the gold medal on vault and balance beam and the silver medal on uneven bars behind Nina Derwael.

Andrade only competed once in 2019; at the DTB Team Challenge in Stuttgart, she helped the Brazilian team win team gold, and she won the all-around gold medal. At the Brazilian Championships, Andrade tore her ACL for the third time in her career. This ended her 2019 season and caused her to miss the 2019 World Championships. At the World Championships, the Brazilian team without Andrade finished fourteenth and did not qualify a team for the 2020 Olympic Games.

2020
Andrade's comeback was cut short by the COVID-19 pandemic. She returned to competition at the Baku World Cup, where she finished third on uneven bars behind Fan Yilin and Anastasia Ilyankova and second on balance beam behind Urara Ashikawa during qualifications and therefore qualified to the event finals. However, the event finals were canceled due to the pandemic in Azerbaijan. In July, Andrade and numerous other Brazilian Olympic hopefuls traveled to Portugal as they were unable to resume training due to the pandemic in Brazil remaining unstable and gyms remaining closed. In December 2020, she tested positive for COVID-19 but was asymptomatic.

2021
Andrade had a breakthrough year in 2021 and won her first Olympic and World medals. She returned to competition at the Pan American Championships which offered her a chance to qualify for the Olympic Games as an individual. The Brazilian team of Andrade, Christal Bezerra, Ana Luiza Lima, Lorrane Oliveira, and Júlia Soares won the gold medal. Individually, Andrade won the gold medal in the all-around with a total score of 56.700. This result earned her and Luciana Alvarado the continental quota spots for the 2020 Olympic Games.

In the qualification round, Andrade qualified in third place to the vault final, fourth to floor exercise final, and second to the all-around final. Following Simone Biles’ withdrawal, Andrade entered the all-around final as the top qualifier. After leading the competition in the first two rotations of the all-around final, Andrade won silver in the all-around after stepping out of bounds on two of her floor exercise tumbling passes. This was the first-ever Olympic medal for a female Brazilian gymnast. 

Setting another record for her country, she won the gold medal in the vault final with an average score of 15.083. This made her the first Olympic champion in Brazilian women's artistic gymnastics history.

In the floor final, Andrade placed fifth with a score of 14.033 after stepping out of bounds on two of her tumbling passes. Reflecting on her success at the Games, Andrade told reporters, "[T]his is not only for me but for the whole of Brazil. I want to inspire younger kids with my achievements... It's not just the medals. I made everybody proud of me." She was chosen to be the flag bearer for Brazil at the closing ceremony.

Andrade continued training after the Olympic Games. She helped her club win the team gold medal at the Brazilian Championships. She also won the gold medal in the all-around. At the World Championships in Kitakyushu, she competed on the vault, uneven bars, and balance beam. She chose not to compete on the floor exercise in order to preserve her health. She qualified for all three event finals. She finished first on both the vault with an average score of 14.800 and on the uneven bars with a score of 15.100, and she finished eighth on the balance beam. She became the first Brazilian gymnast to ever qualify for a World uneven bars event final.

In the vault final, she won the gold medal with an average score of 14.966, nearly a full point ahead of silver medalist Asia D'Amato. This was Brazil's second women's gold medal at the World Artistic Gymnastics Championships, the first being Daiane dos Santos's gold medal on the floor exercise in 2003. Then in the uneven bars final, she scored a 14.633 and won the silver medal behind Chinese gymnast Wei Xiaoyuan becoming the first Brazilian gymnast to win a World medal on the uneven bars. On the next day, she finished sixth in the balance beam event final, tying the best-ever finish of a Brazilian woman in this event with Flávia Saraiva in 2019.

2022
Andrade began her 2022 season in May at the Trophy Brazil, where she won the gold medal on the uneven bars and the silver on the balance beam.

In July, Andrade was named to the Brazilian team for the Pan American Championships alongside Flávia Saraiva, Christal Bezerra, Lorrane Oliveira, Carolyne Pedro and Júlia Soares. On the first day of competition, which determined the all-around and apparatus results, Andrade won the gold medal on the uneven bars as well as the silver medal on the balance beam behind Saraiva. Additionally, she helped Brazil qualify to the team final in first place. She opted not to compete on floor exercise. In the team final, Andrade contributed scores on vault, uneven bars and balance beam towards Brazil's first-place finish ahead of the United States and Canada — their first victory over the United States at the competition since 1997. Andrade stated that "This win is very big for the future of gymnastics [in Brazil], for the girls that are coming up and the ones who came before us."

In August, Andrade competed at the Brazilian Championships, where she won the all-around ahead of Saraiva and Soares and also received the highest scores on vault, uneven bars and balance beam, as well as the second highest on floor exercise, despite performing watered-down routines.  In September Andrade competed at the Paris World Challenge Cup; she only competed on the uneven bars. She won silver behind American Shilese Jones.

In October, Andrade was named to the team to compete at the World Championships in Liverpool alongside Saraiva, Soares, Oliveira, Pedro and Bezerra. In the qualification round, Andrade qualified in first place to the all-around final, second to the floor final, third to the uneven bars final, seventh to the beam final, and helped Brazil qualify to the team final in third place. On vault, she scored 15.066 for her first vault, a Cheng, however, her hands slipped on the table during her second vault attempt, performing just a Yurchenko back tuck instead of her intended double twist. Her second vault scored 11.466, putting her outside the final. In the team final, Brazil finished fourth behind the United States, Great Britain and Canada. In the all-around final, Andrade won the gold medal ahead of Shilese Jones and Jessica Gadirova with a score of 56.899, becoming the first South American gymnast to win a World all-around title. Andrade then won the bronze medal in the floor exercise final alongside Jade Carey, finishing behind Jessica Gadirova and Jordan Chiles, who finished in first and second place respectively.

Personal life 
Andrade became extremely popular in Brazil after her success at the 2020 Olympic Games. In October 2021, she appeared on the cover of Vogue Brasil. She was also awarded the Brazil Olympic Prize which recognized her as the best Brazilian female athlete of the year.

Andrade has worked with a psychologist on visualization techniques. She underwent three ACL reconstruction surgeries, all on her right knee. The gymnast she looks up to the most is Brazilian World Champion Daiane dos Santos.

Competitive history

Notes

References

External links

 
 

1999 births
Living people
People from Guarulhos
Brazilian female artistic gymnasts
Olympic gymnasts of Brazil
Gymnasts at the 2016 Summer Olympics
Gymnasts at the 2020 Summer Olympics
Medalists at the 2020 Summer Olympics
Medalists at the World Artistic Gymnastics Championships
Olympic gold medalists for Brazil
Olympic silver medalists for Brazil
Olympic medalists in gymnastics
World champion gymnasts
Sportspeople from São Paulo (state)
21st-century Brazilian women